The SCCA Formula Super Vee was one of the longest running Formula Super Vee championships in the world. Twenty racing season were contested. Most of the races were sanctioned by the Sports Car Club of America in some occasions the races were sanctioned by the International Motor Sports Association.

History
In 1969 Josef Hoppen, head of the motorsport department of Volkswagen of America, approached the Sports Car Club of America. The Formula Super Vee was announced as an SCCA national class in November 1969. The class was created as a substitute for the overpopulated Formula Vee class. Beach Racing Cars manufactured the first Super Vee car, a single seater using threaded tires and no aerodynamic aides. Settled Formula Vee constructors Zink Cars, Autodynamics and Zeitler Racing Design soon followed. Beach's first Formula Super Vee chassis was bought by Formula Super Vee Europe to promote the racing class in Europe.

Thirteen drivers competed in the first edition of the Formula Super Vee SCCA National Championship Runoffs at Road Atlanta. Driver/constructor John Zeitler qualified on pole but dropped to fifth position. Tom Davey won the prestigious race also racing a Zeitler chassis. In the combined Formula Super Vee/Formula Ford race, Super Vee's finished in the first three places. Skip Barber was the first Formula Ford driver placing fourth overall. The first national series was held in 1971. Bill Scott won the inaugural race at Daytona International Raceway. Scott went on to win races at Road America, Lime Rock Park and Laguna Seca Raceway. The 1972 season entries improved and slick tires were introduced to the series. Scott became the first double champion of the series despite only winning two races. For 1973 international drivers stepped in with Swede Bertil Roos winning three out of the first four races. A late charge from Elliott Forbes-Robinson could not prevent Roos winning the championship.

In 1974 a new Formula Super Vee era began. The series featured fourteen races, two of them outside the United States. Races abroad were run at Mosport Park, Canada and Autódromo Hermanos Rodríguez, Mexico. Series organizer, Josef Hopen, was not loyal to any specific sanctioning body. Half of the races, including the races abroad, were sanctioned by the International Motor Sports Association. . The co-sanctioning continued for 1975 but ended before the 1976 season. Political disagreement resulted in Hoppen pulling the Formula Super Vee Robert Bosch championship out of IMSA. As a response IMSA created the Formula Atlantic class and USAC created the Mini-Indy Series Formula Super Vee.

The next era for Formula Super Vee started in 1978. The class introduced a new, water cooled, Volkswagen Rabbit engine replacing the old air cooled one. The SCCA club racing scene remained using the old engine. The SCCA dropped the class from its regional and national series, merging it into Formula Continental, but the professional series remained. Bill Alsup won the first season of the new era Formula Super Vee championship. Ralt dominated almost every season fielding the most cars out of any constructor. Only the 1983 and 1986 championships were won by other manufacturers.

Champions

References

 
Sports Car Club of America
Formula racing series
Volkswagen Group
Defunct auto racing series